The following is a list of plant species to be found in a north European fen habitat with some attempt to distinguish between reed bed relicts and the carr pioneers. However, nature does not come in neat compartments so that for example, the odd stalk of common reed will be found in carr.

In pools
 Beaked sedge; Carex rostrata
 Whorl grass; Catabrosa aquatica
 Needle spike-rush; Eleocharis acicularis
 Northern spike-rush; Eleocharis austriaca
 Sweet grasses; Glyceria species.
 Common reed; Phragmites australis Swamp meadow grass; Poa palustrisIn typical fen

 Flat sedge; Blysmus compressus Great fen sedge; Cladium mariscus Lesser tufted sedge; Carex acuta Lesser pond sedge; Carex acutiformis Davall's sedge; Carex davalliana Dioecious sedge; Carex dioica Brown sedge; Carex disticha Tufted sedge; Carex elata Slender sedge; Carex lasiocarpa Flea sedge; Carex pulicaris Greater pond sedge; Carex riparia Common spike-rush; Eleocharis palustris Few-flowered spike-rush; Eleocharis quinqueflora Slender spike-rush; Eleocharis uniglumis Broad-leaved cotton sedge; Eriophorum latifolium Reed sweet-grass; Glyceria maxima Yellow flag iris; Iris pseudacorus Brown bog  rush; Schoenus ferrugineusIn fen carr

 Narrow small-reed; Calamagrostis stricta Purple small-reed; Calamagrostis canescens Tussock sedge; Carex paniculata Cyperus sedge; Carex pseudocyperus Wood club rush; Scirpus sylvaticusReferences
Rose, F. Grasses, Sedges, Rushes and Ferns of the British Isles and north-western Europe'' (1989) 

 Fen
Fen
Fen
Fen
Fen
Fen
Fen